The Roman Catholic Archdiocese of Kunming is an archdiocese located in the city of Kunming in China.

The Archdiocese has not had a legitimate, Vatican-appointed Archbishop since 1952, when French Archbishop Alexandre Derouineau was expelled from China in the aftermath of the Chinese Communist Revolution.

The government of the People's Republic of China installed Father Kong Lingzhong as archbishop in 1962 and Father Joseph Ma Yinglin as archbishop in 2006. Neither government appointment is considered legitimate by the Vatican since they were not appointed by the papacy.

In 2000, the Vatican appointed Lawrence Zhang Wen-Chang as Apostolic Administrator of Kunming. He served until his death in 2012.

History

 1687: Established as Apostolic Vicariate of Guangdong-Guangxi-Yunnan from the Apostolic Vicariate of Fujian
 1696: Renamed as Apostolic Vicariate of Yunnan
 1715: Suppressed to the Apostolic Vicariate of Szechwan
 August 28, 1840: Restored as Apostolic Vicariate of Yunnan from the Apostolic Vicariate of Szechwan
 December 8, 1924: Renamed as Apostolic Vicariate of Yunnanfu
 April 11, 1946: Promoted as Metropolitan Archdiocese of Kunming

Leadership
 Archbishops of Kunming 昆明 (Roman rite)
 Archbishop Alexandre-Joseph-Charles Derouineau, M.E.P. (April 11, 1946 – September 30, 1973)
 Vicars Apostolic of Yunnanfu 雲南府 (Roman Rite)
 Bishop Alexandre-Joseph-Charles Derouineau, M.E.P. (later Archbishop) (December 8, 1943 – April 11, 1946)
 Bishop Jean Larregain, M.E.P. (June 13, 1939 – May 2, 1942)
 Bishop Georges-Marie de Jonghe d'Ardoye, M.E.P. (later Archbishop) (May 3, 1933 – October 16, 1938)
 Bishop Charles-Marie-Félix de Gorostarzu, M.E.P. (October 21, 1907 – March 27, 1933)
 Vicars Apostolic of Yunnan 雲南 (Roman Rite)
 Bishop Jean-Joseph Fenouil, M.E.P. (July 29, 1881 – January 10, 1907)
 Bishop Joseph Ponsot, M.E.P. (January 21, 1841 – November 17, 1880)
 Bishop Joachim-Enjobert de Martiliat, M.E.P. (October 2, 1739 – 1752)

Suffragan dioceses
 Dali 大理

Sources
 GCatholic.org
 Catholic Hierarchy
 Archdiocese website (Chinese)

References

Roman Catholic dioceses in China
Religious organizations established in the 1680s
Roman Catholic dioceses and prelatures established in the 17th century
Christianity in Yunnan
Kunming